Albrecht Ritschl is Professor of Economic History at the London School of Economics. He studied at the University of Munich, and previously taught at the Pompeu Fabra University, the University of Zurich and the Humboldt University of Berlin.

References

Living people
Academics of the London School of Economics
Ludwig Maximilian University of Munich alumni
Academic staff of the Humboldt University of Berlin
Academic staff of Pompeu Fabra University
Academic staff of the University of Zurich
Economic historians
Year of birth missing (living people)